USS Plumas County (LST-1083) was an LST-542-class tank landing ship in the United States Navy. Unlike many of her class, which received only numbers and were disposed of after World War II, she survived long enough to be named. On 1 July 1955, all LSTs still in commission were named for US counties or parishes; LST-1083 was given the name Plumas County, after Plumas County, California.

She was built in Ambridge, Pennsylvania by the American Bridge Company, and was launched on 14 January 1945. She  passed through the Panama Canal and saw combat action at Midway, Wake Island, the Marshall Islands, Guam, Saipan, the Mariana Islands, Leyte in the Philippines, and Okinawa.

She was the first LST to drop anchor in Japanese waters after the atom bomb was dropped, and was present at the signing of the Japanese surrender.

She returned to San Francisco after the war, and was decommissioned in August 1946. She was recommissioned on 8 September 1950 and served in the Korean War, finally returning to California in July 1954.  She was named Plumas County on 1 July 1955 and spent the rest of her career operating off California, and in the Pacific, carrying out joint amphibious exercises with Nationalist China and South Korea.  She was placed in reserve at Sasebo on 22 August 1961, and was transferred to the Military Sea Transportation Service in December 1965.

Plumas County earned one battle star during World War II and three battle stars during the Korean War.

References

Haze Gray and Underway

 

LST-542-class tank landing ships
World War II amphibious warfare vessels of the United States
Cold War amphibious warfare vessels of the United States
Korean War amphibious warfare vessels of the United States
USS Plumas County (LST-1083)
Ships built in Ambridge, Pennsylvania
1945 ships